Tarakama or Terekeme  is an Azerbaijani rhythmic folk dance.

Etymology
Terekeme is the name of a tribe settled in Azerbaijan in the ancient times. The dance was originated by the Terekeme people. It is one of the most ancient dances of Azerbaijan. There are two types of Terekeme dance with the same melody. It is mainly performed on weddings and holidays, and with the zurna instrument.

Stamps

External links
 Gövhər Rzayeva - Tərəkəmə

Azerbaijani dances